The Tour de Constantine was a stage race held in Algeria between 2014 and 2016, that was rated 2.2 and was held as part of the UCI Africa Tour.

Winners

References

Cycle races in Algeria
2014 establishments in Algeria
Recurring sporting events established in 2014
2016 disestablishments in Algeria
Recurring sporting events disestablished in 2016
UCI Africa Tour races